The Devil Within is a 1921 American silent adventure film directed by Bernard J. Durning and starring Dustin Farnum, Virginia Valli and Nigel De Brulier.

Cast
 Dustin Farnum as 	Captain Briggs
 Virginia Valli as 	Laura
 Nigel De Brulier as 	Dr. Philiol
 Bernard J. Durning as 	Hal 
 Jim Farley as Scurlock
 Tom O'Brien as Wansley
 Bob Perry as 	Crevay
 Charles Gorman as 	Bevins
 Otto Hoffman as 	Ezra
 Kirk Incas as 	Cabin Boy
 Evelyn Selbie as Witch
 Hazel Deane as Juvenile Witch

References

Bibliography
 Connelly, Robert B. The Silents: Silent Feature Films, 1910-36, Volume 40, Issue 2. December Press, 1998.
 Munden, Kenneth White. The American Film Institute Catalog of Motion Pictures Produced in the United States, Part 1. University of California Press, 1997.

External links
 

1921 films
1921 drama films
1920s English-language films
American silent feature films
Silent American drama films
Films directed by Bernard Durning
American black-and-white films
Fox Film films
1920s American films